The 2010 Trofeo Bellaveglia was a professional tennis tournament played on outdoor red clay courts. This was the second edition of the tournament which is part of the 2010 ATP Challenger Tour. It took place in Orbetello, Italy between 19 July and 25 July 2010.

ATP entrants

Seeds

 Rankings are as of July 12, 2010.

Other entrants
The following players received wildcards into the singles main draw:
  Giulio Di Meo
  Thomas Fabbiano
  Frederico Gaio
  Gianluca Naso

The following players received entry from the qualifying draw:
  Thomas Cazes-Carrère
  Julien Dubail
  Ervin Eleskovic
  Clément Reix

Champions

Singles

 Pablo Andújar def.  Édouard Roger-Vasselin, 6–4, 6–3.

Doubles

 Alessio di Mauro /  Alessandro Motti def.  Nikola Mektić /  Ivan Zovko, 6–2, 3–6, [10–3].

References

Trofeo Bellaveglia
Clay court tennis tournaments
Orbetello Challenger